Yutaka Tokiwa is a Senior Researcher at Okinawa Industrial Technology Center, who has published extensively on the biodegradability of plastics. He has an h-index of 60 according to Google Scholar.

References

Year of birth missing (living people)
Living people
Polymer scientists and engineers